Alfred Cros (2 July 1876 – 28 November 1947) was a French sculptor. His work was part of the sculpture event in the art competition at the 1924 Summer Olympics.

References

1876 births
1947 deaths
19th-century French sculptors
20th-century French sculptors
20th-century French male artists
French male sculptors
Olympic competitors in art competitions
Sculptors from Paris
19th-century French male artists